This is a list of characters from the animated television series Jackie Chan Adventures.

Protagonists

Main cast 
 Jackie Chan (voiced by James Sie in animated sequence; as himself for live-action sequences): The primary protagonist of the series. The fictionalized version for each episode's story is defined as a talented archaeologist who lives in San Francisco, and who maintains the same level of martial art expertise as the real-life actor. A common element in the character's portrayal in the series is a constant notion of feeling pain in his hands when defending himself, utilization of a variety of different objects and elements when in combat, and being placed in awkward situations he is forced to escape from, drawn from inspiration by films starring the actor. In the live-action sequences, the real-life Jackie Chan faces various questions issued by young fans, primarily children, about his life, career, and insight on Chinese culture.
 Jade Chan (voiced by Stacie Chan): Jade is Jackie's niece from the city of Hong Kong, who is adventurous, delinquent, and not obedient in obeying orders to stay safe. She is the second protagonist in the series, and is the sidekick equivalent to Jackie's adventures, with the comedic element of the series often seeing her being frequently placed somewhere safe or secure and thus made to miss out on the action moments her uncle partakes in.
 Lucy Liu voices a future version of the character in a guest role
 Uncle Chan (voiced by Sab Shimono): Uncle is Jackie's uncle and Jade's great-uncle, the third protagonist of the series, acting as a wise sage and researcher of all things magic. The character is defined in the series with a stereotypical Cantonese-accented drawl, talking in the third person about himself, and generally berating Jackie at times for mistakes and oversights. A key element of the character devised by the writers is the repeated use of a Cantonese phrase in magic casting, "Yu Mo Gui Gwai Fai Di Zao" ("Yiu2 mo1 gwai2 gwaai3 faai3 di1 jau2" ) (妖魔鬼怪快哋走), which in English translates as "Evil demons and malevolent spirits, be gone!"

Recurring 
 Captain Augustus Black (voiced by Clancy Brown): A longtime friend of Jackie's, and head of the secretive Section 13 agency. A specialist in fighting crime, he initially disbelieved in magic, but after the finale of the first season, specialises on assigning the Chans to matters where magic is involved and offering aid when required.
 El Toro Fuerte (voiced by Miguel Sandoval): A Mexican masked luchador, who prides himself at never removing his mask and fighting with honor.
 Paco (voiced by Franco Velez): A young Mexican boy, who serves as El Toro's number one fan. A recurring gag with the character is a constant argument with Jade between who amongst Jackie and El Toro is the better man.
 Viper (voiced by Susan Eisenberg): A skilled martial artist, initially operating as a thief, before later retiring to become a security consultant. Often portrayed by the writers as a potential romantic foil for Jackie.
 Super Moose (voiced by Clancy Brown): An anthro moose comic book character, often featured in the series as a toy doll belonging to Jade that comes to life through magic.

Antagonists

Main 

 Shendu (voiced by James Sie): A demonic dragon sorcerer, and one of the series prominent antagonists. For the first two seasons, he acts as the main antagonist of each season's respective overarching storyline, before making recurring appearances in later seasons.
 Valmont (voiced by Julian Sands (season 1–2), Andrew Ableson (season 3–4)): A prominent criminal mastermind, leader of the Dark Hand outfit, and a skilled fighter. The character serves as an secondary antagonist during the first two seasons, before being regulated to a recurring character. Although defined by the writers as a notable character for his role, by the end of the second season his character was later rewritten to serve a comedic foil in stories he appeared in. By the fifth season, the character made only cameo appearance with no speaking role.
 Thomas Dekker also voiced the character, in a guest role
 Daolon Wong (voiced by James Hong): A dark chi wizard, served by demonic fighters and focused on making evil reign supreme. The character is the main antagonist of the third season, though had recurring appearances - firstly in the second season, and then again in the fourth season.
 Tarakudo (voiced by Miguel Ferrer): A demonic entity who leads the Oni, based on the Japanese mythological being of the same name, and the main antagonist of the fourth season. The character is mostly defined as a floating head, and created to provide more background behind the Shadowkhan - a recurring element in the series involving ninja-like shadow warriors.
 Drago (voiced by Michael Rosenbaum): A demonic dragon, the son of Shendu from the future, and the main antagonist of the fifth and final season after being introduced in the fourth season.
 Finn (voiced by Adam Baldwin), Ratso (voiced by Clancy Brown), and Chow (voiced by James Sie): A group of criminal enforcers, initially serving under Valmont, before being forced to serve under other dark magic entities, rarely doing freelance work. A recurring theme is their constant defeats at the hand of Jackie. By the fifth season, the characters became recurring characters with little involvement in the overarching storyline.
 Hak Foo (voiced by John DiMaggio): A muscle-bound martial arts expert, who frequently attacks with moves he defines with metaphorical animal-related descriptions (for example "Angry Crow Takes Flight"). He was initially introduced as a minor character for the first season, but was later made a common antagonist by the second season.
 The character was initially voiced by Jim Cummings in the first season, before DiMaggio assumed the role after the character's role was elevated by the writers.
 Strikemaster Ice (voiced by Mike Erwin), MC Cobra (voiced by Jeff Fischer), and DJ Fist (non-speaking): A group of teenage like criminals, initially introduced in the fourth season, but later becoming a secondary antagonists of the fifth season, replacing the Dark Hand characters in this role.

Minor 
 Lo Pei voiced by David Carradine: An ancient warrior who was responsible for Shendu's first petrification. This set the stage for the series, as his spell also removed the twelve talismans from Shendu, and he then scattered them to the winds. In the present day, a terracotta statue of Lo Pei was placed on an exhibit in San Francisco. Uncle and Jackie were studying the statue, in hopes that it hid the key to finding the remaining talismans. Jade inadvertently broke it, and used the Horse Talisman to heal it. She then brought it to life with the Rat Talisman, bringing Lo Pei to the modern era. Using his Energy, Immobilizer, and Levitation scrolls, he stole the other talismans from Section 13 (the ones that were in the vault at the time.) As he sought to hide the talismans again, he was met by Jackie, whom he mistook for an enemy. He was later tricked by the Dark Hand, who managed to steal all the talismans but the Rat Talisman from him. He then befriended Jade, copying her thumbs-up gesture and her cry of "Hooah!" The Dark Hand and the Shadowkhan came looking for the Rat Talisman, but Lo Pei recovered the other Talismans and threw the Rat Talisman to Jackie and Jade as they made their escape. When the Chans went to visit the statue, they found it slightly altered: one of Lo Pei's hands was making a thumbs-up gesture. Lo Pei later appeared in a Shendu flashback, when Uncle used Lo Pei's original spell to once again return Shendu to stone. Uncle was able to learn about this spell when he interrogated Daolon Wong after he disenchanted him. But rather than scatter the talismans around the world they were only scattered inches from Shendu.
 Drew (voiced by Jeannie Elias): A classmate of Jade's at her school. When Jade would tell the class the adventures she would have with her Uncle Jackie, the class would tease and make fun of her. Drew is often the main instigator and presumably her rival. There are times in the show where Drew is mere feet from unbelievable experiences (like Jade becoming Queen of the Shadowkhan or Hsi Wu posing as a new student to get to Jade and her family,) and he never finds out the truth. Finally, an incident involving talisman-powered animals, Daolon Wong, and his dark warriors would reveal that Jade was telling the truth all along. When he tries to tell the class what he saw, Jade denies that she knew anything, and then the class laughed at him for a change. Regardless, he still acts like a jerk to Jade, possibly due to the aforementioned reason.
 Mrs. Hartman (voiced by Jeannie Elias): The teacher in Jade and Drew's class at Jade's school. She doubted the outrageous stories Jade told in her classroom about the adventures she would have with her Uncle Jackie. Due to this and Jade's disruptive or rude behavior, Mrs. Hartman would either send Jade to detention or call Jackie. Despite this, Mrs. Hartman loves teaching and her class (even Jade). Seen mainly in the first two seasons and the fifth season where she was accidentally mutated into a demoness by the Sky Demon's Chi (this was her most important appearance), Mrs. Hartman had few appearances in the third and fourth seasons.
 Mama Tohru (voiced by Amy Hill): Stern but well-meaning, Tohru's mother makes frequent appearances in the series. The first time, she arrives and makes Tohru feel unworthy of her love, and she immediately hits off on the wrong note with Uncle (such as, calling the antique shop a "junk shop" and calling him a "Billy Goat.") She later proves herself a feisty, if short, woman, by taking down a room full of thugs back-to-back with Uncle. Mama later joins the Chans and Tohru on a cruise ship, where her antagonism of Uncle continues. However, the two once again work together to stop the forces of darkness, tripping several thieves using shuffleboard pucks. Mama appears again during the quest for the Snake Talisman power, and inadvertently infuses part of the magic of the egg it is contained in into her tea by dipping it in, turning her invisible. She aids the Chans once again, where Tohru teaches her that he can take care of himself, and Uncle reluctantly makes her visible again. Her final appearance was during Christmas when she was flying in by plane and saw Tohru flying in a sleigh as Santa Claus (when Tohru, Jade, and Paco were filling in for Santa to deliver presents) and later acknowledged this when he met her at Uncle's shop. Her mannerisms towards Uncle were referenced in later episodes, such as during Tohru's rift with Uncle in Season 4, and when Tohru is infected by an evil mirror spirit, his worst fears about himself come true and he temporarily turns into a giant version of his mother.
 Bartholomew Chang (voiced by Tim Dang (English)): A corrupt Taiwanese businessman with an insatiable craving to possess jade (which evolves into a running catchphrase joke - "the stone, not the niece," or some variant of it - in each episode Chang appears,) and even has a prosthetic hand made of jade. The J-Team encountered him when Captain Black sends them to infiltrate his organization, to find out where the jade is being kept. They enter as contestants in a martial arts tournament, in which Tohru is the only one to win his match. Jade (niece) sneaks into Chang's headquarters, and finds the jade (stone.) While Tohru's former opponents in the sumo competition take care of Chang's hired thugs, the other J-Team members take on the remaining champions. After successfully defeating Chang, the J-Team take him into custody and recover the jade (stone.) Later, Chang returns with a dark wizard at his command, who creates clones of the J-Team to replace and eliminate them, as well as to recover his precious jade (stone.) However, the J-Team originals reverse the spells needed to make the clones evil, and the two J-Teams bring down Chang. He escapes from prison again, however, with the help of his Chang Gang, a group of criminals meant to beat the J-Team at their own strengths. For a while, it seems they might succeed, when an errant spell by Jade de-ages the J-Team into toddlers. However, Jade strengthens the spell and uses it on the Chang Gang, who are then defeated and sent off to juvenile detention. Chang is a parody of the evil Han from Bruce Lee's movie Enter the Dragon, in which Jackie Chan was an extra. The first episode mentioned above was in fact an homage to that movie.
 Kepler (voiced by John DiMaggio): An engineer and inventor working at Section 13. He is frequently too engrossed in his work to notice anything else, especially when Jade greets him and then takes one of his new inventions for a spin. He has invented a jetpack (used by Jade), a chronoton beam (by which Jade gets zapped and is sent into the past by aid of the Rabbit Talisman,) and a chronoton beam detector. As a scientist, he does not believe in magic, but is never present to see any magical forces at work anyway.
 Springheel Jack (Voiced by Corey Burton) - Springheel Jack was a troll who terrorized towns and could leap great distances with his feet (his shoes actually have springs mounted in their heels); he also has a habit of constantly speaking in rhyme. Jack was originally turned to stone by Simeon Magus, using magical salt; because of this, he was eager for revenge on his family. Jackie's light side accidentally broke him free, and he searched the city for the Magus's descendants and devour them in an act of revenge. He arrived at Jade's school play, and threatened her friend Simone, a Magus. The Tiger Talisman separated Jack's Yin and Yang, and his good side revealed the secret to defeating his evil side; subsequently, he was turned to stone again.
The Monkey King - The Monkey King is a self-indulgent and glory-hounding, but rather untalented jokester with a twisted sense of humor. Originally a Sun Wukong puppet that was sold in a shop owned by a rival of Uncle's, he was bought by Jackie and Jade in order for Jade to use in her school's talent show. However, when Jackie pulled his leg at the suggestion of a poem inside, he was mutated into a puppet, while the Monkey King gained a living body. With the Rat Talisman, Puppet-Jackie was reanimated, and both he and Jade set out to stop the Monkey King's magic hijinks from getting out of control at the talent show.

 Meanwhile, Uncle and Tohru went to the shop and Uncle was forced to pay for a book on how to defeat the Monkey King. Using its knowledge, Uncle contacted Jade on Jackie's cellphone when they lured the Monkey King to a cement factory and using one of Puppet-Jackie's disconnected legs was able to trick the Monkey King to pull it to reverse the spell.Later, an innocent construction worker pulled the Monkey King's leg and the Monkey King was free again. The Monkey King then went to Uncle's shop, captured Tohru and tickle-tortured his feet into telling that the Chans were in Hawaii.

 He later interfered with the Chans' quest for the Monkey Talisman power and captured the Noble Monkey. He later attempted to create a volcanic eruption and the Monkey King was confronted by both the Chans and Daolon Wong. In the end, the Monkey King inadvertently caused a distraction long enough for the Chans to get the Monkey out of there and as a result, he was reverted into a puppet by Daolon Wong who used his staff. But his wooden body was the final ingredient needed for his spell; luckily the eruption was not dangerous at all: the so-called "lava" was cherry-flavored jello, and the Monkey King's final joke, when last seen the puppet is in the jello inside the volcano.

 Voiced by: Bill Tanzer (first appearance), Billy West (second appearance)
  Gnome Kop (Brian Doyle-Murray) - Gnome Kop is an action figure that everybody collects. When the Rat Talisman falls into his battery slot, he comes to life and terrorizes the city, looking for his archenemy Turbo Troll. His mission is to find and destroy Turbo Troll, as seen when the Enforcers lead him to believe Section 13 is an evil troll castle, but on his way to lead them to Section 13, he is baited by a Turbo Troll doll and abandons the hunt. Its name is a reference to Pokémon, which it spells when written backwards and without the G.
 Quetzalcoatl (Art Bonilla) - the Aztec god of the sky, sun, and Earth. He is a statue that was brought to life when the Noble Rat touched him. He mistakes Jade for Cihuacōātl, a fellow goddess and El Toro for Xolotl, the god of the underworld. Jade later tricks Quetzalcoatl into believing Daolon Wong is the real Xolotl so he would be of use in defeating him. After having faith in the J-team for protecting the world, he touches the Noble Rat as Jade instructs him and reverts to a statue.
 Po Kong (voiced by Mona Marshall): She is the Mountain Demon, and, by far, the largest of the demons. She appears as a gigantic green-skinned feminine demon with a ravenous appetite, her favorite food being humans. Her portal is located on an island in the middle of Tokyo Bay, Japan. Po Kong's return to her domain in Japan is cut short when she is defeated by an army of magically cloned Jades and sent back to the Netherworld. In the "Demon World" story arc, Po Kong rules Japan and has the enslaved humans there mine large amounts of salt for her meals. She is defeated and banished forever by the Chans and Tohru.

 When Drago sought out the Demon Chi that was on the original symbols that defeated the Demons, Po Kong's Chi was found on a pair of chopsticks that were made of the drumsticks used to play the drum that defeated her. When Drago and his crew arrived, Jackie and Uncle were forced to take all the chopsticks there were with them, having to find which one had the Chi later on. At the time, Jade had Tohru on a diet. When he went down to the kitchen in the middle of the night for some rice, he picked up one of the pair of chopsticks that Jackie and Uncle were looking through, these being the ones with Po Kong's Chi. When Tohru put the chopsticks in his mouth, he was infused with the Mountain Demon Chi. This caused him to go on an eating frenzy, consuming not just all the food in the kitchen, but as well as a large amount of the antiques in Uncle's shop (much to Uncle's dismay), growing bigger and becoming more like Po Kong with each bite, and soon moved on to consume everything in the city. Despite his metamorphosis, part of Tohru was still in control. When Drago and his crew attacked the Chans, Tohru heard Jade screaming and came to their aid, using the Mountain Demon's strength to fight Drago. In the end, Drago managed to suck the Chi out of Tohru and return him to normal, only to lose it to Uncle (along with his Fire Demon Chi.) Drago soon managed to absorb the Chi again along with the other seven powers.
 Tchang Zu (voiced by Clancy Brown): The Thunder Demon, Tchang Zu appears as an armored, blue-skinned reptilian demon, with an arrogant and impatient attitude, and shows a deep dislike for his own brother Shendu, seeing himself as Shendu's master rather than a brother. He possesses the ability to control electricity and lighting. He is the third Demon to be released, his portal revealed to be in the Megagalactic Studios in Hollywood, but Tchang Zu is astonished to find his palace has been paved over and become a parking lot. He attempts to reclaim the Chinese Theatre as his palace, but is defeated by the Chans who banish him back to the Netherworld. In the "Demon World" two-part episode, Tchang Zu's domain is never shown because he is shown visiting Hsi Wu's domain. It is likely that his domain is similar to Hsi Wu's or even an airborne version of Bai Tza's Atlantis, where the domain is located in the sky among the clouds as can be interpreted by his entrance into Hsi Wu's dome through a cloud only to find his brother banished by the J-Team. He battles them but is sealed away forever when Paco reveals castanets (Paco stated that he wanted to keep maracas in his pockets, but the maracas were too big to fit inside,) the item used to seal Tchang Zu away in the first place. In Season 5, Tchang's Chi is contained in a special pair of Immortal Castanets that end up in Drago's hands. Drago gains the power of Lighting, but it is later removed from him by the Chans.
 Hsi Wu (voiced by André Sogliuzzo): The Sky Demon, Hsi Wu (pronounced "chee woo") appears to be a human-sized black-skinned demon with batlike wings, and is presumably, the smallest and weakest, but fastest of the Demons. He was one of the last Demons to be released, his portal located outside the women's bathroom in Fenway Park. Jade accidentally snapped off his tail, forced him to flee when he heard Uncle and Jackie playing the Immortal Flute that banished him hundreds of years ago. He tried to retrieve his tail but Uncle placed a spell that would prevent demons from entering the shop unless they were invited. Seeing Jade, Hsi Wu saw his opportunity. Hsi Wu disguises himself as a human boy named Seymour Jahoositz and quickly befriends Jade. He gets inside the shop and nearly to his tail only to be pushed out by Uncle.

 Next day, he was invited to the Spring dance by Jade who gave him a necklace with one half of a coin. Hsi Wu once again tries to get into the shop only to find that Uncle had hexed his tail to immobilize him. Hsi Wu catches his tail in a bag, revealing himself to everyone (including to the horror of Jade.) He kidnaps Uncle, demanding that he undo the spell or he will kill him; Uncle said that he cannot and required to do another spell, but needed books. The Dark Hand and Valmont brought spell books, but their efforts were thwarted by Jackie and Tohru. Hsi Wu flew off with his tail, determined to find some other way to restore himself. But Jade, empowered by the Rabbit and Rooster Talismans, begins a flight chase across the industrial district against the Sky Demon. She is able to release his tail on the Sky Demon, as Jackie played the Immortal Flute, sending him back to the Netherworld. In the episode "Demon World," the Sky Demon appeared in a high location and had enslaved Viper to sing for him until Jackie played the Immortal Flute and banished Hsi Wu back into the Netherworld.

 In Season 5, Drago and The Chans arrived at an amusement park looking for the Chi of Hsi Wu, the Sky Demon in an Immortal Flute on a carnival ride. The Chans succeed in obtaining the Sky Demon Chi. However, it ends up in Mrs. Hartman, Jade's teacher. She gains the ability to fly and uses it to fight off Drago in a haunted house. Mrs. Hartman slowly mutates into a gremlin batlike creature with a lizard tail, Demon wings, claws, two ugly feet, evil eyes, and beastly appearance much like the Sky Demon. Hsi Wu's Chi is removed from her, and she was convinced it was a bad dream.
 Tso Lan (voiced by Glenn Shadix): The Moon Demon, Tso Lan is likely the most powerful Demon Sorcerer. He is feared for his ability to alter gravity at will and is also quite skilled with telekinesis. He appears as a four-armed, black haired grey-skinned humanoid Demon with a noticeably long tongue and mouth, has a very calm personality and appears proud to some degree. His portal is located half-way between the Earth and the Moon, which the Dark Hand and Shendu reach by using Earth's space system to pass over its location. Upon release, Tso Lan prepares to move the moon out of its orbit, annihilating the Earth's ecosystem in the process to make the planet a more suitable environment for him to live on. The Moon Demon is banished back to the Netherworld by Jackie, Jade, and Tohru using a Lotus Pod related to the Immortal that defeated him thousands of years ago. 

 During the "Demon World" story arc, Tso Lan is one of the four final demons to be banished away forever, with El Toro trying to use the Rooster Talisman to combat Tso Lan. He is believed to be the oldest of his siblings. Tso Lan's mastery of gravity gives the illusion of being the physically strongest demon, as seen when he tossed Po Kong like a feather (something no other Demon could do) and is beyond the strength of the Ox Talisman or the Shadowkhan summoned by the Fourth Mask. 

 In Season 5, Drago came to a zoo searching for Tso Lan's Chi contained in an Immortal Lotus Pod. While fighting the Chans, the Moon Demon's Chi ends up in a panda who uses the ability of gravity to float into the air. Soon, Uncle removes the Moon Demon Chi from the panda, but the containment unit breaks, and both The Moon Demon and The Earth Demon's Chi are released. Drago gains Tso's power and Jackie Chan gets Dai Gui's to fight him off. In the end, both Chis are recovered.  In real-life, the Trigram that Tso Lan corresponds-to in the series ([[Bagua#Trigrams|a broken line atop two unbroken lines), means "lake" &/or "marsh", rather than the moon; Tso Lan is the only one of his demon brethren whose trigram is wrong.  
 Dai Gui (voiced by Frank Welker): The Earth Demon, Dai Gui resembles a large minotaur (with the face of a guardian lion) with great physical strength. He is shown to not be very intelligent (he speaks of himself in the third person,) and has an intense loathing for Shendu and his talismans; perhaps the greatest hatred for him out of all the Demon Sorcerers. He also hates flowers which are also the Immortal item used to banish him originally. He is shown to be able to burrow underground and move like a shark, his horns visible above ground when he digs and when above ground the Earth Demon can cause earthquakes and rumbles. His portal is located in Spain, where Dai Gui attempts to dig a new kingdom underground, but is defeated by Jackie who wears the Armor of the Gods, an item related to the sorcerers who banished the Demons to the Netherworld. In the "Demon World" story arc, Dai Gui is one of the last four demons to be banished, likely ruling Iberia (Spain and Portugal) or part of or all of Europe. He is banished forever upon being defeated by Tohru. During Season 5, Dai Gui's Chi is found in an Immortal Flower and uses by Jackie and Jade's friend "Spectacul Larry" (Larry with the Earth Demon's Chi.)
 Bai Tza (voiced by Mona Marshall): The Water Demon, Bai Tsa appears as a hideous blue-skinned mermaid with waving tentacles for hair (somewhat like a watery Medusa). She is shown to be very cruel, ruthless, and intelligent, immediately escaping the Chans upon her release from the Netherworld realizing that confronting them immediately wouldn't work. Bai Tza is the second strongest of Shendu's siblings (Tso Lan being the strongest,) being able to morph into water to escape. Bai Tza remained at large the longest of all the Demon Sorcerers by simply evading the Chans. As the last of the Demon Sorcerers to be released, she probably is the most intelligent and the most powerful of the Demons. She seems to be the closest to Shendu of his siblings, although she still despises him. Bai Tza used to rule Atlantis, but since it was destroyed ages ago, she required a new empire. She picked San Francisco with the intention to flood it with a tsunami spell. She was banished back to the Netherworld, along with Jade accidentally being sent there too, which in turn led to Shendu's banishment. In the "Demon World" story arc, Bai Tza was one of the final demons to be banished forever, fighting Viper until she was banished after being blown to water when Viper was briefly transformed into "Robo-Viper" (a cyborg version of the character) by Jade meddling with the Book of Ages. In Season 5, Drago came to an island that contained a prize with Bai Tza's Chi on it. He succeeds in absorbing the Water Demon Chi and is granted the element of Water, but Uncle and Tohru quickly removed it from him.
 Xiao Fung (voiced by Glenn Shadix, later Corey Burton): The Wind Demon, Xiao Fung is a large light purple toadlike demon with the ability to suck in huge breaths and release them as blasts of air with hurricane speeds. He was the second Demon Sorcerer to be released, his portal located inside a prison in the United States of America (Alcatraz Island in the video game adaptation.) Xiao Fung finds the prison "a paradise" compared to the Netherworld, and is the first demon to show shapeshifting abilities. He is banished by the Chans. In the "Demon World" story arc, Xiao Fung is shown to rule Mexico or possibly all of South America. He watches El Toro and another wrestler fight to the death, with Paco as a servant. Paco is shown to be fanning Xiao Fung, the fan enchanted to seal Xiao Fung away forever.

 When the Demon Chi began to activate in Season 5, Drago arrived at a car wash trying to find the enchanted Immortal Fan that contains Fung's Chi before being stopped by Jade. Jade soon absorbed the Wind Demon's Chi which turned her current bad burping habits into major windstorms and used it to fight off Drago and his Dragon Enforcers. Drago succeeds in absorbing it, however Uncle removed it before Drago could use it.
 Ikazuki (Maurice LaMarche), Tarakudo's second-in-command and one of the nine Oni Generals. He is the only named Oni General. Ikazuki is also the only Oni General encountered by the J-Team, since the Rat Talisman was used to animate his mask, the intention being to interrogate him. As a side effect of being animated, Ikazuki's mask was the only one that could function when worn somewhere except the face.

See also 
 Jackie Chan Adventures
 List of Jackie Chan Adventures episodes

Jackie Chan Adventures
Fictional characters from San Francisco